The RB12 is major highway of western Tajikistan. Travelling in an east–west direction it connects the north–south M34 north of Ayni with the Uzbek border west of Panjakent. In the former Soviet Union, the road was part of the longer A377 which continued to Samarkand.

References

Roads in Tajikistan